"Do You Wanna Get Funky" is a song by American dance music group C+C Music Factory featuring vocals from Martha Wash, Zelma Davis, and Trilogy. Released as the lead single from their second album, Anything Goes! (1994), it reached number 40 on the US Billboard Hot 100 and topped both the Billboard Hot Dance Club Play chart and the Canadian RPM Dance chart. In Europe and Oceania, it was a hit in several countries, peaking at number two in New Zealand, number five in Finland, number 11 in Australia, and number 18 in the Netherlands. "Do You Wanna Get Funky" was awarded one of ASCAP's Rhythm & Soul Awards in 1995.

Composition
Sampling Nice & Smooth's "Hip Hop Junkies", "Do You Wanna Get Funky" is a Snoop Doggy Dogg-esque ragga, hip hop, and P-funk track "with highly charged vocal performances" and "a slick and insinuating groove that is padded with ear-pleasing synth lines".

Critical reception
Larry Flick from Billboard praised "Do You Wanna Get Funky", predicting that its "killer hook and a memorable refrain" will "push the act up the charts once again". Troy J. Augusto from Cash Box highlighted its "heavy-duty dance groove, some tasty toast-vox from Trilogy and a heaping helping of Ms. Wash’s operatic voice", and also suggested the "fiery track" could be a hit on "a large cross-section of contemporary radio". Pan-European magazine Music & Media wrote, "When was the last C&C hit? In other words, high time for a new one." Brad Beatnik from Music Weeks RM Dance Update called it the best cut "on a rather patchy new album", positively commenting on the choice of sample and "superb diva vocals from Martha Wash and Zelma Davis".

Music video
The accompanying music video produced to promote the single, directed by Keir McFarlane, features the artists performing in a nightclub.

Track listings
 12-inch maxi, US (1994) "Do You Wanna Get Funky" (The C&C Sound Factory house mix) — 8:20
 "Do You Wanna Get Funky" (The Ministry of Sound mix) — 7:58

 CD single, UK and Europe (1994) "Do You Wanna Get Funky" (C+C radio mix) — 4:04
 "Do You Wanna Get Funky" (Ministry of Sound house mix) — 8:00
 "Do You Wanna Get Funky" (Mark the 45 King remix) — 5:29
 "Do You Wanna Get Funky" (C.J.'s full length version) — 9:35
 "Do You Wanna Get Funky" (C.J.'s Funky Organ Vox dub) — 9:03

 CD maxi, US (1994)'
 "Do You Wanna Get Funky" (vocal club mix) — 4:29
 "Do You Wanna Get Funky" (Mark the 45 King remix) — 5:28
 "Do You Wanna Get Funky" (a cappella) — 4:02
 "Do You Wanna Get Funky" (The C+C Sound Factory house mix) — 8:20
 "Do You Wanna Get Funky" (The Ministry of Sound house mix) — 7:58

Charts

Weekly charts

Year-end charts

Certifications

Release history

References

1994 singles
1994 songs
C+C Music Factory songs
Columbia Records singles
Martha Wash songs
Song recordings produced by Robert Clivillés
Songs written by Robert Clivillés
Songs written by David Cole (record producer)